Quzlujeh (also Romanized as Qūzlījeh; also known as Qūzlūjeh, Qowzlūjeh, Ghozlijeh, Quzlajah, and Qūzlūcheh) is a village in Shur Dasht Rural District, Shara District, Hamadan County, Hamadan Province, Iran. At the 2006 census, its population was 70, in 20 families.

References 

Populated places in Hamadan County